The Munster Football Association (MFA) is the governing body for association football in the Irish province of Munster. It is affiliated to the Football Association of Ireland and is responsible for organising the Munster Senior Cup and the Munster Senior League as well as numerous other leagues and cup competitions for junior teams. There are 13 leagues and approximately 800 teams affiliated with the MFA.

History
The MFA was founded in October 1901 and affiliated to the Belfast–based Irish Football Association. In the 1901–02 season the Munster Senior Cup was introduced. According to David Toms there were many civilian and British Army teams based throughout the province, most notably in Cork and Waterford, but also in Limerick and County Tipperary. However the original MFA organising committee was dominated by the British Army, and it fell into abeyance following the outbreak of the First World War. In March 1922 the MFA was re-established  with the help of the Dublin–based Football Association of Ireland. One of the prime movers in reforming the association was a former Ireland international and then Fordsons player, Harry Buckle, who became its vice president and chairman.

Representative games
Munster began playing representative games in as early as 1905. In that year they played an Ulster XI in Cork, losing 3-1. A combined Leinster & Munster team finished as runners up in the 2011 UEFA Regions' Cup. They lost 2–1 to a team representing the Braga Football Association.

Cup competitions
 Munster Senior Cup - since 1901–02
 Munster Junior Cup - since (at least) 1922–23 
 Munster Youth Cup - since 1925–26  
 MFA League Champions Trophy - since 2011–12

Affiliated leagues
Munster Senior League Senior Premier Division 
Munster Senior League
Cork Athletic Union League
Kerry District League 
Limerick Desmond Football League
Limerick District League
West Cork League
WWEC League

See also
 Irish Universities Football Union
 Connacht Football Association
 Leinster Football Association
 Women's Football Association of Ireland
 Galway Football Association

References 

 
Munster
Football
Sports organizations established in 1901
1901 establishments in Ireland